Steffi Graf successfully defended her title, by defeating Arantxa Sánchez Vicario 6–2, 6–1 in the final.

Seeds
The top eight seeds received a bye into the second round.

Draw

Finals

Top half

Section 1

Section 2

Bottom half

Section 3

Section 4

References

External links
 Official results archive (ITF)
 Official results archive (WTA)

Southern California Open
1994 WTA Tour